The Trap is a 1913 American silent short drama film directed by Edwin August, produced by Pat Powers, and starring Murdock MacQuarrie, Pauline Bush and Lon Chaney. The film is now considered lost. Chaney would later appear in an unrelated film of the same name in 1922.

Plot
A jealous girl, Jane, puts paint on her fiance Lon’s overcoat and becomes excited when she finds traces of the paint on another girl’s waist. But it develops that Lon’s brother Chance had worn the coat in the meantime, and she is pacified after an explanation. But later, Chance's wife Cleo finds traces of the paint on Jane's dress and accuses Chance of being unfaithful to her. All is explained in the end.

Cast
 Lon Chaney as Lon
 Murdock MacQuarrie as Chance (Lon's brother)
 Pauline Bush as Jane (Lon's fiance)
 Cleo Madison as Cleo (Chance's wife)

References

External links

1913 films
1913 drama films
1913 short films
1913 lost films
Silent American drama films
American silent short films
American black-and-white films
Films directed by Edwin August
Lost American films
Universal Pictures short films
Lost drama films
1910s American films